develop, The Apple Technical Journal, was a hard-copy magazine published by Apple containing detailed technical and programming articles written primarily by Apple engineers. Twenty-nine quarterly issues were published between January 1990 and March 1997. The headquarters was in Cupertino, CA. With Apple's purchase of NeXT and the subsequent closing of numerous divisions within Apple, develop was closed and turned into a guest column within MacTech which continues to this day.

References

External links
 "develop", Article Archives at MacTech

Quarterly magazines published in the United States
Defunct computer magazines published in the United States
Engineering magazines
Magazines established in 1990
Magazines disestablished in 1997
Magazines published in California
Works about Apple Inc.